Metropolitan Area Commuter System (MACS) is a public transport agency in Fairbanks North Star Borough, Alaska. The agency provides bus service for much of the urbanized Fairbanks Metropolitan Statistical Area. MACS is part of the borough's transportation department and is the northernmost local bus network in continental North America.

History
Prior to the formation of MACS, the public transit needs of Fairbanks were served, if at all, mostly by private operators.  The longest-lasting of these was University Bus Lines, operated by Paul Greimann, Sr.  University Bus Lines primarily provided service to and from Fairbanks, the University of Alaska campus, and Ladd Air Force Base, now Fort Wainwright.

The Fairbanks North Star Borough began exploring the possibilities of offering public transit during the 1970s, when the population and economy of Fairbanks began exploding in conjunction with the construction of the Trans-Alaska Pipeline System.  Voters in the City of Fairbanks voted in 1976 to allow operation of transit buses by the FNSB over the streets of Fairbanks.  The system began operating in 1977 with two routes serving the Fairbanks urban area.

A 1978 study recommended offering service to the outlying areas of the borough, including Ester, Chena Ridge Road, Farmers Loop Road and Goldstream Road. The system expanded to serve North Pole, Salcha and Farmers Loop, Fort Wainwright and other areas of the Fairbanks area. The system now operates 8 routes, and travels over 723,228 miles every year.

Routes

MACS has eight fixed routes identified by color. The Red and Blue Lines provide loop service around urban Fairbanks in opposing directions, while the other routes connect to more outlying destinations. Only the Grey Line does not connect to the Transit Center or overlap with other routes, requiring a transfer from either University of Alaska Fairbanks (UAF) or Fred Meyer East to connect to other routes.

No service is provided on Sundays and holidays. Some routes also lack service on Saturdays.

Fares

Reduced fare rides are offered to youth (ages 6 to 18), individuals with Medicare or Medicaid cards, active duty military servicemembers and their dependents, and those with qualifying disabilities.

Free fare rides are offered to seniors (ages 60+) and children (ages 0-5). Seniors must show government issued photo identification to the driver to ride for free.

Fleet

The fleet consists of nine Gillig Low Floor buses and six demand response vehicles used by the Van Tran service.

Van Tran
While all MACS vehicles are wheelchair accessible, the transit system also operates van service for patrons unable to use the standard bus services. Vans provide door to door service.  In accordance with the Americans with Disabilities Act of 1990, service is prioritized by one's ADA status, not necessarily by need.

In 2011, an effort was initiated to privatize Van Tran.  Spearheaded by conservative Fairbanks North Star Borough Assembly members Diane Hutchinson and Michael Dukes, the system's cost, estimated at between US $61.71 and $76 per ride, was cited as justification.  However, a study commissioned by the Borough Assembly found that privatization would only result in minor cost savings, and no action towards privatization was taken.

References

External links
 

1977 establishments in Alaska
Bus transportation in Alaska
Government agencies established in 1977
Transit agencies in Alaska
Transportation in Fairbanks North Star Borough, Alaska